The Chionosphaeraceae are a family of fungi in the order Agaricostilbales. The family contains six genera. Some species form small, stilboid (pin-shaped) fruitbodies. Others are known only from their yeast states.

References

Agaricostilbales
Chionosphaeraceae
Taxa described in 1982
Taxa named by Franz Oberwinkler